Byron Barwig (July 29, 1862 – December 9, 1943) was a member of the Wisconsin State Senate.

Biography
Barwig was born on July 29, 1862 in Milwaukee, Wisconsin. His father, Charles Barwig, became a member of the United States House of Representatives. In 1865, Barwig moved with his parents to Mayville, Wisconsin. On November 30, 1892, he married Mary Rahlfs. They had three children. Barwig died on December 9, 1943. He was buried in Mayville.

Career
Barwig was elected to the Senate in 1914. Previously, he was Mayor of Mayville and delegate to the 1908 Democratic National Convention.

References

External links

Politicians from Milwaukee
People from Mayville, Wisconsin
Democratic Party Wisconsin state senators
Mayors of places in Wisconsin
1862 births
1943 deaths
Burials in Wisconsin